John Bridges, Brigges or A Bregges (by 1488 – 29 November 1537), of Canterbury, Kent, was an English politician.

Family
Bridges was married to Agnes Hales.

Career
Bridges was a brewer who was Mayor of Canterbury for 1520–21, 1524–25 and 1534–35. He was elected a Member of Parliament for Canterbury in 1523, 1529 and 1536.

References

Year of birth missing
1537 deaths
15th-century births
People from Canterbury
Mayors of Canterbury
English MPs 1523
English MPs 1529–1536
English MPs 1536